The Khukri-class corvette  is a class of corvettes intended to replace the ageing Petya II-class corvettes of the Indian Navy.

The first two were ordered in December 1983 and the remaining in 1985. Around 65% of the ship contains indigenous content. The diesel engines were assembled in India, under license by Kirloskar Group.

Service history
 the lead ship of the class was decommissioned after 32 years of service on 23 December 2021. She has since been preserved as a museum ship in Diu, India.

Ships of the class

See also
List of active Indian Navy ships

References

External links
 

Corvette classes
Ships built in India